Maxima Basu is an Indian fashion designer, actress and director. She was the assistant director of Oscar-winning film Slumdog Millionaire (2009). She has designed for popular Bollywood films like Ram Leela (2013), Bajirao Mastani (2015) and Dangal (2017), which became the highest grossing Indian film of all time, replacing senior designers Rushi Sharma and Manoshi Nath. She won the Filmfare Award for Best Costume Design in 2016 for Bajirao Mastani. She worked in Bajirao Mastani and Ram Leela as a team with designer Anju Modi, both shared 4 wins and 2 nominations jointly. Later, Maxima worked alone for Dangal.

Personal life and education 
Maxima is named after Russian novelist Maxim Gorky. She belongs to a Bengali-speaking Basu family residing in Delhi. She is an Alumna of Kalindi College, Delhi University. 

After her first marriage ended in a divorce, she married her second husband Prashant in an intimate Hindu wedding ceremony held in Kanpur. The couple met on a film set, where Prashant worked as an Art Assistant.

Career
She made her debut with Slumdog Millionaire (2009), in which she designed costumes and assisted Danny Boyle, who earned the Academy Award for Best Director for the film. Later, she switched to designing costumes with 2013 blockbuster Goliyon Ki Raasleela Ram-Leela. Director Sanjay Leela Bhansali gave her the chance. He later repeated her for his next venture Bajirao Mastani. She was applauded nationally. Sanjay, Priyanka Chopra, Deepika Padukone and Ranveer Singh was all in praise for her dresses on their characters. She earned the Filmfare Award for Best Costume Design in 2016 for the film. In 2017, she worked in two films : Bank Chor and Dangal, the latter being the highest grossing Indian film of all time. In 2017, popular designers Manoshi Nath and Rushi Sharma were scheduled to design dresses for Dangal, the highest grossing Indian film of all time. But co-producer Aamir Khan replaced them with her, giving the reason that they charged too much money for the film's budget. The film earned her second Filmfare Nomination.

Filmography

Costume Designer
 Eclipse (TV series) (2021)
Laal Kaptaan (2019)
 The Elder One (2019)
Kalank (2019)
Raazi (2018)
Padmaavat (2018)
Bank Chor (2017)
Raabta (2017)
Dangal (2016)
Bajirao Mastani (2015)
Goliyon Ki Raasleela Ram-Leela (2013)
Peepli (Live) (2010)

Actress

Ship of Theseus (Nurse) -- 2012
Peepli (Live) (TV reporter) -- 2010

1st Unit Director/Assistant Director

 Ship of Theseus (Segment - Aida's Story)

Miscellaneous

Slumdog Millionaire (Assistant : Director)

Awards

References

External links
 

Living people
Fashion stylists
People from West Bengal
Indian women fashion designers
Filmfare Awards winners
Year of birth missing (living people)